Selembu is a dual purpose dairy and beef breed of cattle. It is the result of gaur/zebu hybridisation. The name is a hybrid from Malay name of Seladang (gaur) and Lembu (Cow).

External links
 http://fishbase.mnhn.fr/ComNames/CommonNameSearchSpeciesList.cfm?CommonName=Selembu
  http://www.pet-cockatiel.com/Dboard/viewtopic.php?f=29&t=929

Cattle breeds